Cracked Actor (or full title, Cracked Actor: A Film About David Bowie) is a 1975 television documentary film about the musician David Bowie, made by Alan Yentob for the BBC's Omnibus strand. It was first shown on BBC1 on 26 January 1975.

It was filmed in 1974 when Bowie was struggling with cocaine addiction, and the documentary has become notable for showing his mental state during this period.

Content
The documentary depicts Bowie on tour in Los Angeles, using a mixture of documentary sequences filmed in limousines and hotels, and concert footage. Most of the concert footage was taken from a show at the Los Angeles Universal Amphitheatre on 2 September 1974. There were also excerpts from D. A. Pennebaker's concert film Ziggy Stardust and the Spiders from Mars, which had been shot at London's Hammersmith Odeon on 3 July 1973, as well as a few other performances from the tour. Cracked Actor is notable for being a source for footage of Bowie's ambitious Diamond Dogs Tour.

Production
The title of the documentary was originally to be The Collector, after a comment that Bowie had made to interviewer Russell Harty the previous year, whereby he described himself as "a collector of accents". Yentob and his team were given the task of documenting Bowie's famous Diamond Dogs tour, which was already underway when they started filming. Locations for the documentary mainly centred on Hollywood and Los Angeles, but there was also concert footage taken from Philadelphia. A number of performances from the tour were shown, including the songs "Space Oddity", "Cracked Actor", "Sweet Thing/Candidate", "Moonage Daydream", "The Width of a Circle", "Aladdin Sane", "Time", "Diamond Dogs" and "John, I'm Only Dancing (Again)".

Legacy

The tour and film coincided with a prolific time in Bowie's recording and acting career. During the summer of 1974, Bowie started recording at Sigma Studios Philadelphia for what became the Young Americans LP. After seeing an advanced screening of the film, director Nicolas Roeg immediately contacted Bowie to discuss The Man Who Fell to Earth. Photos from Bowie in the US in 1974 on tour and recording, of which some sequences can be seen in Cracked Actor, have been used elsewhere, including the cover of David Live and inserts for the Rykodisc and anniversary booklets for the CD pressings of the LPs that include "Young Americans". Biographer Nicholas Pegg calls Cracked Actor "arguably the finest documentary made about David Bowie," while Paul Trynka considers it one of the greatest music documentaries ever made.

In 1987, while working on his album Never Let Me Down, Bowie reflected in an interview about his state of mind during the time the film was made:

In 2013, Alan Yentob said of the film: "I'd caught him at what was an intensely creative time, but it was also physically and emotionally gruelling. Our encounters tended to take place in hotel rooms in the early hours of the morning or in snatched conversations in the back of limousines. He was fragile and exhausted but also prepared to open up and talk in a way he had never really done before."

Commercial status

The documentary remains officially unreleased, though there are bootleg video copies circulating as a result of the programme being shown again by the BBC in the early 1990s and more recently in 2007, 2008, and 2013.

References

Sources

External links

1975 films
British documentary films
BBC television documentaries
Rockumentaries
Documentary films about singers
David Bowie
1975 documentary films
1970s English-language films
1970s British films